The Wheelock Law Office is a historic commercial building at 135 North Main Street in the city of Barre, Vermont.  Built in 1871 for a prominent local lawyer, it is a fine example of Second Empire architecture, and a rare surviving domestically scaled building in an area now primarily filled with larger commercial buildings.  It was listed on the National Register of Historic Places in 1975.

Description and history
The Wheelock Law Office building stands in the central business district of Barre, on the north side of North Main Street between Keith Avenue and Pearl Street.  It is sandwiched on a narrow lot between a 20th-century single-story commercial block, and a three-story late 19th-century commercial buildings.  It is a 1-1/2 story brick building, with a bellcast mansard roof providing a full second story.  The right side of the front consists of a 2-1/2 story tower, with the building entrance at the base in a round-arch opening.  A round-arch window is set above it in the second story, and the tower is capped by a bellcast roof with oculus window dormers.  The left side of the front has a large display window on the first floor, and gabled dormers flanking an oculus window dormer in the steep portion of the mansard.  A modern single-story addition projects to the rear.  The interior of the building retains no historic elements, having been repeatedly remodeled for varying commercial uses.

The building was erected in 1871 for Langdon Wheelock, then one of the city's leading attorneys.  The area was at the time a tree-lined residential street, with Wheelock's house, a Federal period brick building demolished in 1946, located next door.  Since Wheelock's death in 1873, the building has seen a variety of commercial uses.  It is a rare reminder of the once domestic scale of the surrounding streetscape.

The building is owned by the City of Barre. In 2019 the building became home to a welcome center operated by the Barre Partnership. The Barre Partnership is Barre's officially designated community revitalization community organization.

See also
 Charles Marsh Law Office: NRHP listing in Woodstock (village), Vermont
 National Register of Historic Places listings in Washington County, Vermont

References

Second Empire architecture in Vermont
Buildings and structures completed in 1871
Buildings and structures in Barre (city), Vermont
National Register of Historic Places in Washington County, Vermont
Law offices
Vermont law